Parodia buiningii is a rare species of cactus native to South America. It is a solitary spherical or oblate cactus only a few inches in height with long, yellow spines. It bears yellow flowers, and produces hairy fruit and black seeds. It is found surrounding the towns of Santana do Livramento, Brazil and Rivera, Uruguay.

Taxonomy
The species was first described as Notocactus buiningii by F. Buxbaum in 1968, and was given its current name by N. P. Taylor in 1968, based on Buxbaum's earlier description. Despite objections from hobbyists (among whom Notocactus species were popular) Notocactus (and others) have now been synonymised under Parodia.

Description
They have small tubercles. The areoles, which are sunken under the tubercles, are initially woolly, though they lose the wool as they mature.

Distribution
Parodia buiningii grows solitarily. It is found around Santana do Livramento, Rio Grande do Sul, Brazil and the neighboring Rivera, Uruguay. However, the species is rare. It grows sympatrically with Parodia allosiphon, with which it is closely related.

References

buiningii
Flora of Brazil
Flora of Uruguay
Cacti of South America